Calyptratae is a subsection of Schizophora in the insect order Diptera, commonly referred to as the calyptrate muscoids (or simply calyptrates). It consists of those flies which possess a calypter that covers the halteres, among which are some of the most familiar of all flies, such as the house fly.

About 18,000 described species are in this group, or about 12% of all the flies yet described.

Subsection
Superfamily Muscoidea
Anthomyiidae - cabbage flies
Fanniidae
Muscidae - house flies
Scathophagidae - dung flies
Superfamily Oestroidea
Calliphoridae
Mystacinobiidae
Oestridae
Rhinophoridae
Sarcophagidae
Tachinidae
Ulurumyiidae
Superfamily Hippoboscoidea
Glossinidae
Hippoboscidae
Nycteribiidae
Streblidae
The Mormotomyiidae belong to the Ephydroidea and not to Hippoboscoidea as previously construed.
The Streblidae are probably not monophyletic.

References